Kelly Dean Saalfeld (born February 15, 1956) is a former center in the National Football League (NFL). Saalfeld was drafted by the Green Bay Packers in the ninth round of the 1980 NFL Draft and would play that season with the New York Giants.

Currently works for a Culligan Water provider.

References

People from Columbus, Nebraska
New York Giants players
American football centers
Nebraska Cornhuskers football players
1956 births
Living people